Nuestra Belleza Tamaulipas 2010, was held at the Teatro Amalia Caballero de Castillo Ledón, Cd. Victoria, Tamaulipas on August 14, 2010. At the conclusion of the final night of competition, Cecilia Ortíz of Reynosa was crowned the winner. Ortíz was crowned by outgoing Nuestra Belleza Tamaulipas titleholder, Ana Karen González. Ten contestants competed for the state title.

Results

Placements

Background Music
Aldo
Paulina Goto

Contestants

Contestants Notes
Cecilia Ortíz was the original winner of Nuestra Belleza Tamaulipas 2010. The 1st Runner-up, Claudia González was who represented Tamaulipas in Nuestra Belleza México 2010, where she won  the Academic Award and placed in the Top 15. Cecilia Ortíz quit the state crown for health reasons that prevent her from participating in national competition.

References

External links
Official Website

Nuestra Belleza México